The 1988 Campeon de Campeones was the 35th edition of this Mexican Super Cup football match played by:

 League winners: América
 Cup winners: Puebla

The first leg was played on 7 July 1988 at Puebla and the second leg was played on 10 July 1988 at Mexico DF.

In the first game, Puebla dominated over América but in the second game América saved the match with two goals and became winner of the Mexican Super Cup Campeón de Campeones, a competition that had not been played since 1972.

Match details

First Leg

Second Leg

References
Mexico - Statistics of season 1987/1988. (RSSSF)
Mexico - Statistics of Mexican Supercup. (RSSSF)

Cam
Campeón de Campeones
July 1988 sports events in Mexico